Brandubh of Tynagh, fl. c. 500 AD, Irish missionary.

Brandubh is listed the Irish genealogies as Brandamh Tighe nEathach m. Eachach m. Ainmireach m. Aengusa m. Lomáin (Brandugh of Tynagh son of Eochu son of Ainmire son of Aonghus son of Lomáin').

He founded the church of Tynagh sometime around 500 AD. Evidence suggests that Tynagh was originally a cult centre for the festival of Lughnasa, later Christianised by Brandubh, who was cited as Lugh's son, thus betraying its true origins.

From about the 8th to the 17th centuries the region Tynagh is located was known as Síol Anmchadha

See also

 Conainne
 St Connell
 Kerrill
 Téach
 Martyrology of Tallaght

References
 The Christian impact on early Ireland;placename evidence, Deirdre Flannagan in Irland un Europa, ed. P Ni Cathain and Michael Richter, Stuttgart, 1984, pp. 25–51.
 Early Ecclesiastical Settlement Names of County Galway, Dónall Mac Giolla Easpaig, in "Galway:History and Society - Interdisciplinary Essays on the History of an Irish County", pp. 805–807, Dublin, 1996. .

Christian clergy from County Galway
5th-century Irish priests